This is a list of schools in Penang, Malaysia. As of 2017, there are 589 schools in Penang.

Primary schools

National Primary Schools

Missionary National Primary Schools

Chinese-type Primary Schools

Tamil-type Primary Schools

Religious Primary Schools (SABK)

Special Education Primary Schools

Secondary schools

National Daily Secondary Schools

Missionary National Secondary Schools

National-type Secondary Schools

Fully Residential School

MARA Junior Science Colleges

National Sport Secondary Schools

Sixth form college (Kolej Tingkatan 6)

Vocational Secondary Schools

Technical/Vocational Secondary Schools

Religious Secondary Schools

Islamic National Secondary Schools (SMKA)

Islamic Government-Aided Secondary Schools (SABK)

Special Education Secondary Schools

Private schools

Chinese Independent High School

International schools

Expatriates schools

People's Religious Schools

Special Education Private Schools

Other Private Schools

References

Penang